The 2006 Copa del Rey Juvenil was the 56th staging of the tournament. The competition began on May 14, 2006 and ended on June 24, 2006 with the final.

First round

|}

Quarterfinals

|}

Semifinals

|}

Final

Copa del Rey Juvenil de Fútbol
Juvenil